Chen He (born 28 July 1989) is a Chinese sailor. He competed in the Finn event at the 2020 Summer Olympics.

References

External links
 
 

1989 births
Living people
Chinese male sailors (sport)
Olympic sailors of China
Sailors at the 2020 Summer Olympics – Finn
Sportspeople from Shandong
21st-century Chinese people